Joel McCoun White (December 21, 1930 – December 5, 1997) was an American naval architect.

Early life and education
Born in Manhattan, White was the son of the writer E. B. White and his wife Katharine Sergeant Angell White, fiction editor of The New Yorker. He was the son with whom E. B. White revisited the lake where he had gone on boyhood vacations, as chronicled in his 1941 essay "Once More to the Lake"; the essayist Roger Angell was his stepbrother. He grew up in North Brooklin, Maine and attended Cornell University, then transferred after two years to MIT, from where he graduated in 1953 with a bachelor's degree in naval architecture.

Career
White worked as a boat builder in Newport News, Virginia, served in the Army, then in 1960, in a former herring-packing plant, established Brooklin Boat Yard, where he became known for simple, classic craft from dinghies to yachts, mostly in wood. His Nutshell Pram, under 8 ft long, was sold in plywood kit form. The 15-foot Haven 12½ sailboat has a reputation for stability and for handling shallow water. The Bridges Point 24 is a 24-foot fiberglass sailboat. His last design, a 76-foot racing yacht in 1920s style, was realized and further developed by Donald Tofias, and has been named W-Class after White.

He contributed designs to WoodenBoat magazine and in 1988 published Wood, Water & Light: Classic Wooden Boats, with photographs by Benjamin Mendlowitz; in the New York Times, Christopher Lehmann-Haupt called it a "lovely work [that] includes a dinghy, a runabout, a lobsterboat, a peapod, a sardine carrier, an oceangoing yacht, several speedboats and all manner of sailboats".

Personal life and death
White and his wife, Allene, had two sons and a daughter. He died of lung cancer in 1997 at home in Brooklin.

References

Further reading 
 
 

Deaths from lung cancer
American naval architects
1930 births
1997 deaths
20th-century American architects
People from Brooklin, Maine
20th-century American engineers